St. Sophia Home of the Little Sisters of the Poor, also known as the Little Sisters of the Poor Home for the Aged, is a historic Roman Catholic hospital and convent located in Richmond, Virginia, United States.  The original residence known as "Warsaw" was built in 1832, and subsequently incorporated into the Italianate style brick hospital building between 1877 and 1881.  A convent wing was added in 1894 and a service wing in the 1950s.  The building is a -story, brick structure on a brick basement with a Second Empire style mansard roof. The charity hospital was operated by the Little Sisters of the Poor order, who vacated the home in 1976. The building was subsequently converted to apartments.

It was listed on the National Register of Historic Places in 1980.

References

Buildings and structures in Richmond, Virginia
Hospital buildings on the National Register of Historic Places in Virginia
Italianate architecture in Virginia
Properties of religious function on the National Register of Historic Places in Virginia
Religious buildings and structures completed in 1832
Residential buildings completed in 1832
Hospital buildings completed in 1881
Religious buildings and structures completed in 1881
Residential buildings on the National Register of Historic Places in Virginia
National Register of Historic Places in Richmond, Virginia
Second Empire architecture in Virginia
1881 establishments in Virginia